The United States Virgin Islands national basketball team is the side which represents internationally the US Virgin Islands in women's basketball.

The country earned its first continental berth at 2015 FIBA Americas Women's Championship.

The also competed at the 2017 FIBA Women's AmeriCup, where it qualified for the 2019 Pan American Games in Lima, Peru.

FIBA Americas Championship record
 2015 – 9th place
 2017 – 5th place
 2021 – 8th place

Current roster
Roster for the 2021 FIBA Women's AmeriCup.

References

External links
FIBA profile

Women's national basketball teams
basketball